Malot is a rural area in Islamabad. It is located near Bhara Kahu between Kuri and Simly Dam roads. There are many societies in the current village. Whose name is Bahria enclave, Park view city and Islamabad Model Town. This village is very beautiful. An old road passes through this village Whose name is Kuri Road. Right along with this village Old City of برصغیر Its name is kuri city. Immediately after the Capital of Pakistan This is a village Which is closest to Islamabad and People own land.

Population
The population of  Malot is approximately 3000 to 4000. The majority of the population is Muslim and consists of Abbasi and Kiyanis families. In total population, 2% are Kashmiries, 20% are Syed, 30% are Kiyanis and 48% are Abbasis.

Languages
Different languages are spoken here which include Potohari, Hindko and Urdu.

Employment
Some people are mid level employs in Public or private organizations, but most locals earn money through agriculture, livestock and  farming. people are also connected to real state and property business. Almost from each family  people are serving abroad, in middle east and all other countries. Nowadays maximum people are property dealers.

Culture
Punjabi culture dominates this area. Eid  festivals are celebrated. Crops cultivated here include Wheat, Maize and Barley. In southern part of Malot, Bahria started their 2nd real estate society name Bahria Enclave. On northern side there is a hill which is located for Botanic Zoo from CDA. Now hill area is totally reserved for Park View society by Aleem Khan (PTI member). Farooq abbasi from malot also bought several hill area as his property. Maximum area of hill is reserved for property. Near hill area several acres property is bought by FIA.

Villages in Islamabad Capital Territory